Hooker is an unincorporated community in Tehama County, in the U.S. state of California.

History
A post office was in operation at Hooker from 1885 until 1928. The community has the name of J. M. Hooker, a pioneer settler. The community once had a schoolhouse, Hooker School, now defunct.

References

Unincorporated communities in Tehama County, California